Brian D'Amato is an American author and sculptor.

Biography
When he was young, his father taught at Wellesley College. During this time, Hillary Clinton (at the time, named Hillary Rodham), a student at the college, babysat him.

D'Amato went to high school at New Trier High School in the suburbs of Chicago.

D'Amato received a BA from Yale University and an MA from the CUNY Graduate Center. At Yale, D'Amato studied with John Hollander, Erwin Hauer, and William Bailey. At the Graduate Center of the City University of New York, he studied with Robert Pincus-Witten.

In the 1990s, D'Amato showed sculptures and installations at galleries and museums including the Whitney Museum, the Wexner Center for the Arts, and the New Museum of Contemporary Art.  He has written for magazines, including Harper's Bazaar, Index Magazine, Vogue, Flash Art, and Artforum, and he has taught art and art history at the City University of New York, Ohio State University, and Yale University.

D'Amato's 1992 novel, Beauty, a thriller (with horror elements) about cosmetic surgery, was translated into several languages.  His next novel, titled In the Courts of the Sun, is the first book of The Sacrifice Game trilogy and was published by Dutton in 2009. New American Library published a trade paperback edition in 2009. The second book in the trilogy,  The Sacrifice Game, was published by Dutton 2012. Beauty is being republished by Little, Brown and Company's Mulholland Classics line in 2013. D'Amato's work is often associated with the genres of Biopunk, Transhumanism in fiction, and Posthumanism. D'Amato is the son of Northwestern Law professor Anthony D'Amato and mystery novelist Barbara D'Amato.

Bibliography
 Beauty (1992)

The Sacrifice Game Trilogy
 In the Courts of the Sun (2009)
 The Sacrifice Game (2012)

References

External links

Living people
20th-century American novelists
Interactive art
American male journalists
New Trier High School alumni
Yale University alumni
Ohio State University faculty
Graduate Center, CUNY alumni
21st-century American novelists
20th-century American sculptors
American male sculptors
American male novelists
American horror writers
20th-century American male writers
21st-century American male writers
Novelists from Ohio
20th-century American non-fiction writers
21st-century American non-fiction writers
Year of birth missing (living people)
20th-century American male artists